David Colin Hanna FRS (born 1941) is a British physicist specializing in laser physics and nonlinear optics. He is emeritus professor of physics at the University of Southampton. His research interests include quasi-phase-matched nonlinear materials, optical parametric oscillators, fibre lasers, and X-ray sources based on high harmonic generation.

Hanna was awarded the Max Born Prize in 1993, the European Physical Society Prize for Applied Aspects of Quantum Electronics and Optics in 2000, and the Charles Hard Townes Medal in 2003. Hanna was elected to the Royal Society in 1998.

Works

References

British physicists
Laser researchers
Fellows of the Royal Society
Academics of the University of Southampton
Living people
1941 births